The American Public Human Services Association (APHSA) is a nonprofit organization made up of multiple programs made to assist families improve their lives. Founded in 1930, the APHSA is headquartered in Washington, D.C.

Issues
The APHSA takes on many issues, including:

 Adoption
 Child Care
 Child Support
 Child Welfare
 Disabilities
 Food Stamps
 Temporary Assistance for Needy Families

Affiliates

 American Association of Food Stamp Directors
 American Association of Welfare Attorneys
 Association of Administrators of the Interstate Compact on Adoption and Medical Assistance
 Association of Administrators of the Interstate Compact on the Placement of Children
 IT Solutions Management for Human Services
 National Association for Program Information and Performance Measurement
 National Association of Public Child Welfare Administrators
 National Association of State Child Care Administrators
 National Association of State Medicaid Directors
 Center for Workers with Disabilities
 National Association of State TANF Administrators
 National Staff Development and Training Association

External links
Official site

Non-profit organizations based in Washington, D.C.
Organizations established in 1930